Nangade District is a district of Cabo Delgado Province in northern Mozambique. It covers 3,005 km² with 71,588 inhabitants (2015). It is bordered by Mtwara Region, Tanzania to the north.

External links
Government profile 

Districts in Cabo Delgado Province